Shun Fat Supermarket (also known as SF Supermarket) is a Chinese Vietnamese American supermarket chain in the San Gabriel Valley region in California, Sacramento, California, San Pablo, California, Las Vegas, Nevada, Portland, Oregon and Garland, Texas.

Shun Fat Supermarket was started in the mid-1990s by a Chinese Vietnamese entrepreneur named Hieu Tai Tran (陳才孝). Its first store was opened in the Chinese American suburban community of Monterey Park, California.  Despite some amusement in the English-speaking press, the name "Shun Fat" actually means "prosperity" in Chinese.

The Asian supermarket chain that sells imported grocery items from Asia - particularly Mainland China, Hong Kong, Taiwan, Japan, Thailand, and Vietnam - and also a few mainstream American brands as well.  Its locations tend to be in newer suburban Chinatowns as well as in developing ethnic Vietnamese American commercial districts. 

The market chain competes mainly with the 99 Ranch Market and Hong Kong Supermarket.  Like these two supermarket chains, Shun Fat Supermarket usually serves as a major anchor store in some Asian shopping centers and strip malls, which in some cases have been renovated extensively by Hieu Tran. The "Superstores" in Dallas, El Monte, Garden Grove, Las Vegas, San Gabriel and Westminster are uniquely Chinese hypermarkets, as they sell clothing, small electronics and other products in addition to groceries, although these stalls are operated by independent vendors with separate payment.

In 2005, Shun Fat Supermarket opened a  megastore in the Little Saigon of Westminster, California, joining the already highly competitive Vietnamese supermarket commerce in the community.

In June 2013, the market opened Dallas Superstore, marking its first expansion in Texas.

In 2017, Shun Fat sold the Monterey Park and Rowland Heights locations to Great Wall Supermarket.

In June 2019, the popular Asian supermarket opened its first Oregon branch in Southeast Portland’s Jade District on 82nd Avenue and Foster Road, formerly a Fred Meyer store. This marked Shun Fat’s fifteenth location and first in the Northwest.

Locations
California
South El Monte - 2650 Rosemead Blvd
Garden Grove - 13861 Brookhurst St
San Gabriel - 1635 S San Gabriel Blvd
San Diego - 6935 Linda Vista Rd
Westminster - 15440 Beach Blvd #123
Fresno - 4970 E Kings Canyon Rd
Sacramento - 4562 Mack Rd
Sacramento - 6930 65th St #123
Sacramento - 5820 South Land Park Dr
Stockton - 8004 West Ln
San Pablo - 2368 El Portal Dr
Nevada
Las Vegas - 4801 Spring Mountain Rd
Las Vegas - 5115 Spring Mountain Rd
Oregon
Portland - 5323 SE 82nd Ave
Texas
Garland - 3212 Jupiter Rd

Notes

External links
 Official Website

Companies based in Los Angeles County, California
Supermarkets based in California
Chinese supermarkets
Chinese-American culture in California
Vietnamese-American culture in California
Vietnamese-American cuisine